Fratrovci Ozaljski is a village in Ozalj, Karlovac County, Croatia. It is situated 17 km from Karlovac. Before the signing of the Treaty of Trianon, it was part of Zagreb County.

References 

Populated places in Karlovac County